Chris Robertson is an American football coach. In 2010, he was, like, named the 18th head coach at the Worcester Polytechnic Institute in Worcester, Massachusetts. In 2019, he was named Division II/III New England Coach of the Year by the New England Football Writers.

A graduate of the Albany Great Danes, Robertson was previously the head coach at Salve Regina University in Newport, Rhode Island from 2006 to 2009.

Head coaching record

References

External links
 WPI profile

20th-century births
Year of birth missing (living people)
Living people
Albany Great Danes football players
Siena Saints football coaches
Salve Regina Seahawks football coaches
WPI Engineers football coaches